is a hack and slash video game developed by Omega Force and published by Tecmo Koei for the Nintendo 3DS. It was released as a launch title in Japan on February 26, 2011, in Europe on March 25, 2011, in North America on March 27, 2011 and Australia on March 31, 2011.

Gameplay
Samurai Warriors: Chronicles introduces several new features not included in prior Samurai Warriors games. While the top screen displays the main game, the bottom screen is used to display maps, KOs, and mission data. A player can switch between four characters during battle, switching the screen to their respective locations as well.

Unlike previous titles, where the player chooses one character and focuses on his or her story, in Chronicles the player chooses a male (wielding a katana and rifle) or female (wielding dual swords) character to play as a primary character in every story battle, following his or her own story and changing around different armies. Each battle also allows the player to have one to four (depending on the battle) side characters to switch between during the battle. Before a stage is cleared these are fixed on certain characters related to the story. After the mission has been cleared once, the player can change these characters out to any characters that have been unlocked for free play. Every character taking place in a battle receives XP, and the weapons found during the mission are divided out according to the player's choosing between these characters.

Characters
Every playable character from Sengoku Musou 3: Moushouden/Z is playable in this game. There is a story mode that follows all the events in Samurai Warriors 3. There are no separate story lines for game characters; however, game characters that star in the battle can be played. The two new officers, the main Hero and the main Heroine, are brand new original characters to the series, fully customizable by the player. The player will use either of them for all of the game (unless they replay the stage in which case all unlocked characters can be chosen), while switching control to the other returning officers during battles.

Development
Samurai Warriors: Chronicles was first announced during E3 2010 as Samurai Warriors 3D as a part of the Nintendo 3DS line-up. The game was subsequently renamed Samurai Warriors: Chronicles, which occurred during Tokyo Game Show 2010.

Reception

Samurai Warriors: Chronicles was met with mixed reception upon release; GameRankings gave it a score of 63%, while Metacritic gave it 61 out of 100.

Legacy
The game was followed by two sequels. The first,  was released only in Japan on September 13, 2012, also for the Nintendo 3DS. Being an overhaul of the original game, it has the same general storyline and several of the characters' movesets with expanded content. It features multiple story paths for the two protagonists, new events for returning characters, and a new competitive multiplayer mode akin to Challenge Mode. It also introduces three new characters: Munenori Yagyū, Naotora Ii, and Takatora Tōdō, all of whom would also be introduced to the main series starting on Samurai Warriors 4. In addition, several characters from other games in the Warriors series make appearance as NPCs.

The second,  features new scenarios and systems as well as over 50 characters from Samurai Warriors 4. It was released for the 3DS as well as the PlayStation Vita in Japan on December 4, 2014. Samurai Warriors Chronicles 3 has also been released digitally in Europe on June 24, 2015 and North America on June 30, 2015.

Both Samurai Warriors Chronicles 2nd and Samurai Warriors Chronicles 3 support the Circle Pad Pro when played on the Nintendo 3DS.

References

External links
Samurai Warriors: Chronicle Official website for Japan 
Samurai Warriors: Chronicles Official website for North America

2011 video games
Nintendo 3DS eShop games
Nintendo 3DS-only games
Video games about samurai
Samurai Warriors
Koei games
Nintendo 3DS games
Video games developed in Japan
Video games set in feudal Japan
Video games featuring protagonists of selectable gender